1995 Yokohama Marinos season

Review and events
Yokohama Marinos won J.League Suntory series (first stage).

League results summary

League results by round

Competitions

Domestic results

J.League

J.League Championship

Emperor's Cup

Player statistics

 † player(s) joined the team after the opening of this season.

Transfers

In:

Out:

Transfers during the season

In
 Pedro Fernando Massacessi (from Pumas on April)
 Masahiko Nakagawa (from Yokohama Flügels)

Out
 Junji Koizumi (to Yokohama Flügels)
 Ramón Díaz (on May)
 Takashi Mizunuma (retired)
 Shigetatsu Matsunaga (to Tosu Futures)

Awards
J.League Rookie of the Year:  Yoshikatsu Kawaguchi
J.League Best XI:  Masami Ihara,  Masaharu Suzuki

References

Other pages
 J. League official site
 Yokohama F. Marinos official site

Yokohama Marinos
Yokohama F. Marinos seasons